Femme Fatale, Jang Hee-bin or Concubine Jang Hui-bin is a 1968 South Korean film directed by Im Kwon-taek.

Plot 
A concubine, Jang Ok-jung, is made queen by King Sukjong, and plots to drive the old queen into exile. After her plot fails due to the intervention of nobles loyal to the old queen, Jang is enraged and murders her rival. She attempts to assert her influence over Sukjong, but is undone by her ambitions and executed in public.

Cast 
 Nam Jeong-im as Jang Hee-bin
 Shin Seong-il as King Sukjong
 Tae Hyun-sil as Queen Inhyeon
 Gang Mun
 Do Kum-bong
 Han Eun-jin
 Jeong Ae-ran
 Heo Jang-kang as Jang Hee-bin's uncle
 Kim Seong-ok
 Bang Su-il

External links 
 
 

1968 films
1968 drama films
1960s historical drama films
South Korean historical drama films
Films set in the 1680s
Films set in the 1690s
Films set in the 1700s
Films set in the Joseon dynasty
Films directed by Im Kwon-taek
1960s Korean-language films